Umyla Hanley (born 5 March 2002) is a professional rugby league footballer who plays as a  for the Leigh Leopards in the Super League.

Background
Hanley played his amateur rugby league for the Shevington Sharks and is the son of former Bradford, Wigan, Leeds, Western Suburbs, Balmain and Great Britain international, Ellery Hanley.

Career

2020
Hanley made his Super League debut in round 14 of the 2020 Super League season for the Warriors against St Helens where Wigan went on to lose 42–0 against a much more experienced St Helens team, Hanley started at fullback and became Wigan Warrior player #1105.

2021
In round 17 of the 2021 Super League season, Hanley scored a hat-trick in Wigan's 50-6 victory over Leigh.

2022
Hanley made only one appearance for Wigan in the 2022 Super League season. He spent the majority of the year on loan with RFL Championship side Newcastle playing ten games.

References

External links
Wigan Warriors profile

2002 births
Living people
English rugby league players
English people of Jamaican descent
Leigh Leopards players
Newcastle Thunder players
Rugby league fullbacks
Rugby league players from Wigan
Wigan Warriors players